Seo Soo-jin (born March 9, 1998), better known mononymously as Soojin, is a South Korean singer and dancer. She is a former member of the girl group (G)I-dle under Cube Entertainment.

Early life
Soojin was born in Gyeonggi, South Korea. She attended Waw Middle School in Hwaseong. She later learned jazz dance and taekwondo while studying at the Korean Arts High School. She decided early in her life that she wanted to pursue a singing career, but said it took two years for her to convince her father to agree with her decisions.

Career

Pre-debut
Soojin was a trainee in DN Entertainment and was originally supposed to be a member of the South Korean girl group Vividiva under her stage name N.Na (앤나), She took part in several performances and photo shoots of the group, but then left the group in 2015.

Then in 2016, Soojin became a trainee at Cube Entertainment. In 2017–2018 she appeared in fellow-member Soyeon's solo music videos for the songs "Jelly" and "Idle Song" as an unknown dancer and wearing a mask.

2018–2020: Debut with (G)I-dle and solo activities

In 2018, she was revealed as a member of the girl group (G)I-dle. She debuted with the group on May 2, 2018, following the release of the group's debut mini album, I Am and its lead single "Latata". (G)I-dle made their debut stage performance on Mnet's M Countdown.

In October 2020, Glance TV introduced their new fashion show Minnie Soojin's i'M THE TREND  and paired Seo and Minnie together. The duo will have a styling battle every time for the title of 'Trend Center', which is a combination of a trend setter and an idol center. In addition, the duo will revealed their styling secrets, various outfits, shopping tips and video pictorial 'Fashion Film'. The show premiered on October 14 through Naver Style TV.

On October 22, 2020, according to Cube Entertainment, Soojin was examined and treated at the hospital for a sprained ankle which she sustained during choreography practice. Soojin visited the hospital for examination and treatment. The agency said, "As a result of the examination by the medical staff, the ankle ligament has increased, and according to the opinion of the medical staff to wear a cast and protector until recovery, we will live with minimal movement for the time being and is unable to participate in the group's upcoming schedules, including '2020 LIVE in DMZ' on October 23 and '2020 K-Culture Festival' on October 24.

2021–2022: Bullying scandal and departure from (G)I-dle and Cube Entertainment 
On March 4, 2021, it was announced that Soojin would temporarily halt all activities following allegations of bullying by former classmates. On August 14, Cube Entertainment announced that Soojin had officially withdrawn from (G)I-dle, though she will remain under the same agency. (G)I-dle will also continue its activities as a five-member girl group after her departure.

On March 5, 2022, Cube Entertainment announced that they have officially terminated Soojin's contract after police investigations concluded that the accusers were not guilty of spreading false information.

On September 8, 2022, Soojin's legal representative released a statement on her behalf that stated Soojin had never committed any act of school violence, and that Soojin would not proceed any further with legal action.

Discography

Filmography

Variety shows

References

External links 

South Korean female idols
South Korean female models
South Korean female dancers
South Korean women singer-songwriters
K-pop singers
1998 births
Cube Entertainment artists
(G)I-dle members
Living people
People from Hwaseong, Gyeonggi
21st-century South Korean women singers
English-language singers from South Korea
Japanese-language singers of South Korea
Mandarin-language singers of South Korea
South Korean female taekwondo practitioners